Nelsonville is an unincorporated community in Marion County, in the U.S. state of Missouri.

History
A post office called Nelsonville was established in 1851, and closed at a later date. The community has the name of one Mr. Nelson, a first settler.

References

Unincorporated communities in Marion County, Missouri
Unincorporated communities in Missouri